Cou may refer to:

 Cao (surname), sometimes romanized "Cou" in Cantonese
 An alternate spelling of the Tsou language
 An alternate spelling of the Tsou people of Taiwan

See also 
 COU (disambiguation)